Christoph Rütimann (born 20 May 1955 in Zurich) is a Swiss painter currently based in Müllheim.

Awards
 1989: Conrad Ferdinand Meyer Prize
 2005: International Art Award of Vorarlberg

References

20th-century Swiss painters
Swiss male painters
21st-century Swiss painters
21st-century Swiss male artists
Swiss contemporary artists
1955 births
Living people
20th-century Swiss male artists